The Bump is a form of popular dance introduced in the 1970s in the United States. Two partners, generally one male and one female, bump their hips against each other to the beat of the song. Sometimes the dance can be more suggestive, with the female dancer bumping her hip against the male dancer's crotch. For this reason, the Bump is often believed to be the precursor to the erotic and controversial dance grinding.

Sources 

 
 
 

 

Novelty and fad dances
Funk dance
1970s fads and trends